The 1988 Toronto Blue Jays season was the franchise's 12th season of Major League Baseball. It resulted in the Blue Jays finishing tied for third in the American League East with a record of 87 wins and 75 losses. This was their last full season at Exhibition Stadium before moving to their new home in June of the following year.

Offseason
February 22, 1988: Mark Ross was signed as a free agent by the Blue Jays.
March 24, 1988: Sal Butera was signed as a free agent by the Blue Jays.
March 25, 1988: Willie Upshaw was purchased from the Blue Jays by the Cleveland Indians.

Regular season
April 4, 1988: George Bell set a major league record for the most home runs hit on Opening Day, with three. Bell accomplished this in a game versus the Kansas City Royals.
September 24 and 30, 1988: Dave Stieb had two consecutive no-hitters broken up in the ninth inning with two outs and two strikes.

Season standings

Record vs. opponents

Notable transactions
June 1, 1988: David Weathers was drafted by the Toronto Blue Jays in the 3rd round of the 1988 amateur draft. Player signed June 4, 1988.

Roster

Game log

|- align="center" bgcolor="bbffbb"
| 1 || April 4 || @ Royals || 5 – 3 || Key (1-0) || Saberhagen (0-1) || Henke (1) || 40,648 || 1-0
|- align="center" bgcolor="bbffbb"
| 2 || April 6 || @ Royals || 11 – 4 || Flanagan (1-0) || Leibrandt (0-1) || || 18,938 || 2-0
|- align="center" bgcolor="ffbbbb"
| 3 || April 7 || @ Royals || 7 – 4 || Gubicza (1-0) || Clancy (0-1) || || 29,070 || 2-1
|- align="center" bgcolor="ffbbbb"
| 4 || April 8 || @ Twins || 6 – 3 || Blyleven (1-0) || Stieb (0-1) || Reardon (1) || 53,067 || 2-2
|- align="center" bgcolor="bbffbb"
| 5 || April 9 || @ Twins || 10 – 0 || Key (2-0) || Lea (0-1) || Ward (1) || 49,451 || 3-2
|- align="center" bgcolor="ffbbbb"
| 6 || April 10 || @ Twins || 4 – 2 || Viola (1-1) || Stottlemyre (0-1) || Reardon (2) || 40,086 || 3-3
|- align="center" bgcolor="bbffbb"
| 7 || April 11 || Yankees || 17 – 9 || Wells (1-0) || Rhoden (1-1) || || 45,185 || 4-3
|- align="center" bgcolor="ffbbbb"
| 8 || April 12 || Yankees || 12 – 3 || Candelaria (1-0) || Clancy (0-2) || || 24,116 || 4-4
|- align="center" bgcolor="ffbbbb"
| 9 || April 13 || Yankees || 5 – 1 || Dotson (2-0) || Stieb (0-2) || || 24,105 || 4-5
|- align="center" bgcolor="ffbbbb"
| 10 || April 14 || Yankees || 7 – 3 || Leiter (2-0) || Key (2-1) || || 24,524 || 4-6
|- align="center" bgcolor="bbbbbb"
| -- || April 15 || Twins || colspan=6|Postponed (cold weather) Rescheduled for August 4
|- align="center" bgcolor="ffbbbb"
| 11 || April 16 || Twins || 3 – 2 || Berenguer (1-2) || Wells (1-1) || Reardon (4) || 26,095 || 4-7
|- align="center" bgcolor="bbffbb"
| 12 || April 17 || Twins || 2 – 0 || Flanagan (2-0) || Straker (0-1) || Henke (2) || 37,532 || 5-7
|- align="center" bgcolor="bbffbb"
| 13 || April 19 || Royals || 12 – 3 || Clancy (1-2) || Saberhagen (1-2) || || 21,231 || 6-7
|- align="center" bgcolor="bbffbb"
| 14 || April 20 || Royals || 3 – 0 || Stieb (1-2) || Leibrandt (1-3) || Henke (3) || 20,202 || 7-7
|- align="center" bgcolor="bbffbb"
| 15 || April 22 || @ Yankees || 6 – 4 (12) || Wells (2-1) || Stoddard (1-1) || Henke (4) || 33,314 || 8-7
|- align="center" bgcolor="bbffbb"
| 16 || April 23 || @ Yankees || 3 – 2 || Cerutti (1-0) || Candelaria (1-2) || Henke (5) || 24,046 || 9-7
|- align="center" bgcolor="ffbbbb"
| 17 || April 24 || @ Yankees || 5 – 3 || Hudson (2-0) || Eichhorn (0-1) || || 52,073 || 9-8
|- align="center" bgcolor="ffbbbb"
| 18 || April 26 || Athletics || 6 – 1 || Davis (2-1) || Stieb (1-3) || Eckersley (9) || 21,280 || 9-9
|- align="center" bgcolor="ffbbbb"
| 19 || April 27 || Athletics || 5 – 3 || Young (1-0) || Flanagan (2-1) || Honeycutt (2) || 20,236 || 9-10
|- align="center" bgcolor="ffbbbb"
| 20 || April 28 || Athletics || 6 – 2 || Stewart (6-0) || Stottlemyre (0-2) || Honeycutt (3) || 21,178 || 9-11
|- align="center" bgcolor="ffbbbb"
| 21 || April 29 || Angels || 9 – 5 || Harvey (1-0) || Wells (2-2) || || 23,483 || 9-12
|- align="center" bgcolor="ffbbbb"
| 22 || April 30 || Angels || 6 – 1 || Finley (2-3) || Cerutti (1-1) || || 29,091 || 9-13
|-

|- align="center" bgcolor="bbffbb"
| 23 || May 1 || Angels || 6 – 4 || Stieb (2-3) || Witt (1-3) || Henke (6) || 36,115 || 10-13
|- align="center" bgcolor="ffbbbb"
| 24 || May 2 || @ Mariners || 7 – 5 || Trout (3-2) || Flanagan (2-2) || Solano (2) || 13,197 || 10-14
|- align="center" bgcolor="bbffbb"
| 25 || May 3 || @ Mariners || 9 – 2 || Stottlemyre (1-2) || Campbell (2-3) || Ward (2) || 9,970 || 11-14
|- align="center" bgcolor="ffbbbb"
| 26 || May 4 || @ Athletics || 3 – 2 || Welch (4-2) || Clancy (1-3) || Eckersley (11) || 21,401 || 11-15
|- align="center" bgcolor="ffbbbb"
| 27 || May 5 || @ Athletics || 8 – 5 || Plunk (3-1) || Núñez (0-1) || || 16,998 || 11-16
|- align="center" bgcolor="bbffbb"
| 28 || May 6 || @ Angels || 3 – 2 || Stieb (3-3) || Witt (1-4) || Henke (7) || 29,237 || 12-16
|- align="center" bgcolor="bbffbb"
| 29 || May 7 || @ Angels || 9 – 4 || Flanagan (3-2) || Fraser (3-2) || Wells (1) || 32,630 || 13-16
|- align="center" bgcolor="ffbbbb"
| 30 || May 8 || @ Angels || 8 – 1 || McCaskill (2-3) || Stottlemyre (1-3) || || 29,026 || 13-17
|- align="center" bgcolor="ffbbbb"
| 31 || May 10 || Mariners || 4 – 2 || Langston (3-3) || Clancy (1-4) || || 28,290 || 13-18
|- align="center" bgcolor="bbffbb"
| 32 || May 11 || Mariners || 9 – 3 || Stieb (4-3) || Moore (2-4) || || 27,575 || 14-18
|- align="center" bgcolor="bbffbb"
| 33 || May 12 || Mariners || 8 – 2 || Flanagan (4-2) || Swift (2-1) || || 30,334 || 15-18
|- align="center" bgcolor="ffbbbb"
| 34 || May 13 || @ White Sox || 4 – 1 || Pérez (3-0) || Stottlemyre (1-4) || || 10,583 || 15-19
|- align="center" bgcolor="ffbbbb"
| 35 || May 14 || @ White Sox || 7 – 5 || LaPoint (4-2) || Cerutti (1-2) || Long (2) || 23,532 || 15-20
|- align="center" bgcolor="ffbbbb"
| 36 || May 15 || @ White Sox || 6 – 5 (11) || Thigpen (1-3) || Eichhorn (0-2) || || 13,948 || 15-21
|- align="center" bgcolor="bbffbb"
| 37 || May 16 || @ White Sox || 5 – 1 || Stieb (5-3) || Horton (3-6) || || 8,310 || 16-21
|- align="center" bgcolor="ffbbbb"
| 38 || May 17 || Rangers || 7 – 6 (14) || Mohorcic (2-0) || Eichhorn (0-3) || || 25,170 || 16-22
|- align="center" bgcolor="ffbbbb"
| 39 || May 18 || Rangers || 4 – 0 || Hayward (3-0) || Stottlemyre (1-5) || || 25,029 || 16-23
|- align="center" bgcolor="bbffbb"
| 40 || May 20 || @ Brewers || 3 – 1 || Clancy (2-4) || Wegman (4-5) || Wells (2) || 19,539 || 17-23
|- align="center" bgcolor="bbffbb"
| 41 || May 21 || @ Brewers || 4 – 0 || Stieb (6-3) || Bosio (6-4) || Henke (8) || 38,124 || 18-23
|- align="center" bgcolor="ffbbbb"
| 42 || May 22 || @ Brewers || 7 – 1 || Birkbeck (2-3) || Flanagan (4-3) || || 37,658 || 18-24
|- align="center" bgcolor="ffbbbb"
| 43 || May 23 || @ Brewers || 9 – 7 || Jones (2-0) || Stottlemyre (1-6) || Plesac (9) || 10,523 || 18-25
|- align="center" bgcolor="bbffbb"
| 44 || May 24 || @ Rangers || 13 – 2 || Cerutti (2-2) || Hayward (3-1) || Henke (9) || 26,408 || 19-25
|- align="center" bgcolor="ffbbbb"
| 45 || May 25 || @ Rangers || 5 – 1 || Russell (3-0) || Clancy (2-5) || Mohorcic (4) || 13,528 || 19-26
|- align="center" bgcolor="ffbbbb"
| 46 || May 26 || @ Rangers || 8 – 7 || Williams (1-1) || Henke (0-1) || || 13,035 || 19-27
|- align="center" bgcolor="bbffbb"
| 47 || May 27 || White Sox || 4 – 3 || Ward (1-0) || Thigpen (1-5) || || 31,454 || 20-27
|- align="center" bgcolor="ffbbbb"
| 48 || May 28 || White Sox || 3 – 2 || Pérez (5-1) || Stottlemyre (1-7) || Thigpen (8) || 42,420 || 20-28
|- align="center" bgcolor="bbffbb"
| 49 || May 29 || White Sox || 4 – 2 || Cerutti (3-2) || LaPoint (4-4) || Wells (3) || 42,057 || 21-28
|- align="center" bgcolor="ffbbbb"
| 50 || May 30 || Brewers || 4 – 1 || Higuera (4-3) || Clancy (2-6) || Plesac (11) || 27,275 || 21-29
|- align="center" bgcolor="bbffbb"
| 51 || May 31 || Brewers || 9 – 0 || Stieb (7-3) || Bosio (6-6) || || 28,446 || 22-29
|-

|- align="center" bgcolor="bbffbb"
| 52 || June 1 || Brewers || 7 – 2 || Flanagan (5-3) || Birkbeck (2-5) || Ward (3) || 31,012 || 23-29
|- align="center" bgcolor="bbffbb"
| 53 || June 2 || @ Red Sox || 5 – 4 || Wells (3-2) || Hurst (6-3) || Eichhorn (1) || 32,144 || 24-29
|- align="center" bgcolor="bbffbb"
| 54 || June 3 || @ Red Sox || 6 – 3 || Stottlemyre (2-7) || Boyd (5-4) || Henke (10) || 32,292 || 25-29
|- align="center" bgcolor="bbffbb"
| 55 || June 4 || @ Red Sox || 10 – 2 || Clancy (3-6) || Clemens (8-3) || Ward (4) || 33,067 || 26-29
|- align="center" bgcolor="bbffbb"
| 56 || June 5 || @ Red Sox || 12 – 4 || Ward (2-0) || Smithson (1-2) || || 33,756 || 27-29
|- align="center" bgcolor="ffbbbb"
| 57 || June 6 || @ Indians || 6 – 3 || Farrell (6-3) || Flanagan (5-4) || Jones (13) || 9,550 || 27-30
|- align="center" bgcolor="ffbbbb"
| 58 || June 7 || @ Indians || 5 – 3 || Bailes (6-4) || Wells (3-3) || || 21,696 || 27-31
|- align="center" bgcolor="ffbbbb"
| 59 || June 8 || @ Indians || 4 – 2 || Yett (5-3) || Clancy (3-7) || Jones (14) || 10,571 || 27-32
|- align="center" bgcolor="bbffbb"
| 60 || June 10 || Red Sox || 3 – 0 || Stieb (8-3) || Sellers (0-6) || Henke (11) || 35,201 || 28-32
|- align="center" bgcolor="bbffbb"
| 61 || June 11 || Red Sox || 4 – 3 (10) || Ward (3-0) || Lamp (1-2) || || 40,461 || 29-32
|- align="center" bgcolor="ffbbbb"
| 62 || June 12 || Red Sox || 8 – 2 || Boyd (6-5) || Cerutti (3-3) || || 40,123 || 29-33
|- align="center" bgcolor="ffbbbb"
| 63 || June 13 || Indians || 8 – 6 || Black (3-1) || Clancy (3-8) || Jones (15) || 31,133 || 29-34
|- align="center" bgcolor="bbffbb"
| 64 || June 14 || Indians || 3 – 2 || Ward (4-0) || Candiotti (6-6) || || 31,433 || 30-34
|- align="center" bgcolor="bbffbb"
| 65 || June 15 || Indians || 15 – 3 || Stieb (9-3) || Swindell (10-4) || || 45,472 || 31-34
|- align="center" bgcolor="bbffbb"
| 66 || June 16 || @ Tigers || 13 – 5 || Flanagan (6-4) || Morris (6-8) || || 22,927 || 32-34
|- align="center" bgcolor="ffbbbb"
| 67 || June 17 || @ Tigers || 12 – 5 || Hernández (4-2) || Wells (3-4) || || 36,274 || 32-35
|- align="center" bgcolor="ffbbbb"
| 68 || June 18 || @ Tigers || 6 – 1 || Terrell (3-3) || Clancy (3-9) || || 42,186 || 32-36
|- align="center" bgcolor="bbffbb"
| 69 || June 19 || @ Tigers || 6 – 4 || Ward (5-0) || Henneman (1-2) || Henke (12) || 35,639 || 33-36
|- align="center" bgcolor="bbffbb"
| 70 || June 20 || Orioles || 5 – 2 || Stieb (10-3) || Boddicker (3-10) || Henke (13) || 28,301 || 34-36
|- align="center" bgcolor="ffbbbb"
| 71 || June 21 || Orioles || 4 – 2 || Peraza (1-2) || Flanagan (6-5) || Niedenfuer (7) || 28,259 || 34-37
|- align="center" bgcolor="bbffbb"
| 72 || June 22 || Orioles || 4 – 2 || Cerutti (4-3) || Ballard (3-4) || Ward (5) || 28,395 || 35-37
|- align="center" bgcolor="bbffbb"
| 73 || June 23 || Orioles || 5 – 2 || Clancy (4-9) || Tibbs (2-4) || Wells (4) || 28,259 || 36-37
|- align="center" bgcolor="bbffbb"
| 74 || June 24 || Tigers || 6 – 3 || Stottlemyre (3-7) || Terrell (3-4) || Henke (14) || 40,533 || 37-37
|- align="center" bgcolor="ffbbbb"
| 75 || June 25 || Tigers || 7 – 2 || Alexander (7-4) || Stieb (10-4) || || 45,091 || 37-38
|- align="center" bgcolor="bbffbb"
| 76 || June 26 || Tigers || 4 – 1 || Flanagan (7-5) || Robinson (8-3) || Henke (15) || 45,278 || 38-38
|- align="center" bgcolor="ffbbbb"
| 77 || June 27 || @ Orioles || 6 – 2 || Ballard (4-4) || Cerutti (4-4) || || 17,212 || 38-39
|- align="center" bgcolor="ffbbbb"
| 78 || June 28 || @ Orioles || 7 – 0 || Tibbs li  (3-4) || Clancy (4-10) || Thurmond (1) || 16,241 || 38-40
|- align="center" bgcolor="bbffbb"
| 79 || June 29 || @ Orioles || 4 – 2 || Key (3-1) || Schmidt (3-3) || Henke (16) || 18,059 || 39-40
|-

|- align="center" bgcolor="ffbbbb"
| 80 || July 1 || Athletics || 2 – 1 || Stewart (11-6) || Stieb (10-5) || Eckersley (24) || 35,243 || 39-41
|- align="center" bgcolor="ffbbbb"
| 81 || July 2 || Athletics || 11 – 3 || Young (6-5) || Flanagan (7-6) || Nelson (3) || 33,511 || 39-42
|- align="center" bgcolor="ffbbbb"
| 82 || July 3 || Athletics || 9 – 8 (16) || Burns (1-0) || Cerutti (4-5) || || 32,329 || 39-43
|- align="center" bgcolor="ffbbbb"
| 83 || July 4 || Angels || 11 – 6 || Cliburn (3-0) || Clancy (4-11) || || 30,584 || 39-44
|- align="center" bgcolor="bbffbb"
| 84 || July 5 || Angels || 4 – 1 || Key (4-1) || Witt (6-9) || Ward (6) || 32,284 || 40-44
|- align="center" bgcolor="ffbbbb"
| 85 || July 6 || Angels || 5 – 4 (10) || Harvey (3-2) || Wells (3-5) || Moore (2) || 31,312 || 40-45
|- align="center" bgcolor="bbffbb"
| 86 || July 8 || Mariners || 3 – 2 || Flanagan (8-6) || Swift (6-6) || Ward (7) || 30,247 || 41-45
|- align="center" bgcolor="ffbbbb"
| 87 || July 9 || Mariners || 9 – 3 || Bankhead (4-3) || Stottlemyre (3-8) || || 31,373 || 41-46
|- align="center" bgcolor="bbffbb"
| 88 || July 10 || Mariners || 5 – 0 || Key (5-1) || Moore (4-9) || || 35,323 || 42-46
|- align="center" bgcolor="bbffbb"
| 89 || July 14 || @ Athletics || 7 – 1 || Flanagan (9-6) || Welch (10-6) || || 20,639 || 43-46
|- align="center" bgcolor="bbffbb"
| 90 || July 15 || @ Athletics || 1 – 0 || Key (6-1) || Stewart (12-8) || || 26,476 || 44-46
|- align="center" bgcolor="ffbbbb"
| 91 || July 16 || @ Athletics || 4 – 1 || Davis (7-4) || Stieb (10-6) || Eckersley (27) || 33,287 || 44-47
|- align="center" bgcolor="bbffbb"
| 92 || July 17 || @ Athletics || 9 – 6 || Ward (6-0) || Young (6-7) || Henke (17) || 31,695 || 45-47
|- align="center" bgcolor="bbffbb"
| 93 || July 18 || @ Angels || 12 – 2 || Musselman (1-0) || Finley (5-9) || Clancy (1) || 24,241 || 46-47
|- align="center" bgcolor="bbffbb"
| 94 || July 19 || @ Angels || 7 – 6 || Henke (1-1) || Harvey (4-3) || || 24,131 || 47-47
|- align="center" bgcolor="ffbbbb"
| 95 || July 20 || @ Angels || 7 – 6 || Minton (3-1) || Cerutti (4-6) || Moore (4) || 25,598 || 47-48
|- align="center" bgcolor="ffbbbb"
| 96 || July 21 || @ Mariners || 6 – 2 || Bankhead (5-4) || Stieb (10-7) || Schooler (7) || 9,024 || 47-49
|- align="center" bgcolor="ffbbbb"
| 97 || July 22 || @ Mariners || 10 – 9 (10) || Schooler (2-3) || Henke (1-2) || || 10,506 || 47-50
|- align="center" bgcolor="bbffbb"
| 98 || July 23 || @ Mariners || 5 – 2 || Musselman (2-0) || Trout (4-6) || || 17,979 || 48-50
|- align="center" bgcolor="bbffbb"
| 99 || July 24 || @ Mariners || 6 – 0 || Flanagan (10-6) || Langston (7-9) || || 10,487 || 49-50
|- align="center" bgcolor="ffbbbb"
| 100 || July 25 || @ Twins || 5 – 4 || Winn (1-0) || Henke (1-3) || || 31,936 || 49-51
|- align="center" bgcolor="ffbbbb"
| 101 || July 26 || @ Twins || 6 – 3 || Portugal (1-1) || Ward (6-1) || Reardon (26) || 42,185 || 49-52
|- align="center" bgcolor="bbffbb"
| 102 || July 27 || @ Twins || 4 – 1 || Cerutti (5-6) || Viola (16-3) || Henke (18) || 51,687 || 50-52
|- align="center" bgcolor="bbffbb"
| 103 || July 29 || Yankees || 7 – 1 || Musselman (3-0) || Dotson (8-4) || || 42,453 || 51-52
|- align="center" bgcolor="ffbbbb"
| 104 || July 30 || Yankees || 3 – 1 || Candelaria (12-6) || Flanagan (10-7) || Righetti (15) || 45,457 || 51-53
|- align="center" bgcolor="ffbbbb"
| 105 || July 31 || Yankees || 6 – 3 || Rhoden (7-6) || Key (6-2) || Righetti (16) || 41,401 || 51-54
|-

|- align="center" bgcolor="bbffbb"
| 106 || August 1 || Twins || 3 – 1 || Stieb (11-7) || Viola (16-4) || Henke (19) || 33,206 || 52-54
|- align="center" bgcolor="bbffbb"
| 107 || August 2 || Twins || 11 – 1 || Clancy (5-11) || Lea (6-5) || || 30,327 || 53-54
|- align="center" bgcolor="ffbbbb"
| 108 || August 3 || Twins || 8 – 3 || Atherton (6-5) || Musselman (3-1) || Reardon (27) || 31,340 || 53-55
|- align="center" bgcolor="ffbbbb"
| 109 || August 4 || Twins || 2 – 1 || Anderson (9-7) || Flanagan (10-8) || || 21,140 || 53-56
|- align="center" bgcolor="bbffbb"
| 110 || August 5 || Royals || 7 – 6 || Ward (7-1) || Power (5-5) || Henke (20) || 31,357 || 54-56
|- align="center" bgcolor="ffbbbb"
| 111 || August 6 || Royals || 11 – 1 || Gubicza (14-6) || Stieb (11-8) || || 34,411 || 54-57
|- align="center" bgcolor="ffbbbb"
| 112 || August 7 || Royals || 5 – 1 || Bannister (9-9) || Clancy (5-12) || || 37,304 || 54-58
|- align="center" bgcolor="bbffbb"
| 113 || August 8 || Royals || 5 – 1 || Musselman (4-1) || Saberhagen (12-11) || Henke (21) || 32,234 || 55-58
|- align="center" bgcolor="bbffbb"
| 114 || August 9 || @ Yankees || 6 – 3 || Flanagan (11-8) || Candelaria (12-7) || Ward (8) || 30,089 || 56-58
|- align="center" bgcolor="bbffbb"
| 115 || August 10 || @ Yankees || 5 – 0 || Key (7-2) || Rhoden (7-8) || Henke (22) || 28,026 || 57-58
|- align="center" bgcolor="bbffbb"
| 116 || August 11 || @ Yankees || 6 – 5 (11) || Ward (8-1) || Righetti (3-3) || || 30,347 || 58-58
|- align="center" bgcolor="bbffbb"
| 117 || August 12 || @ Royals || 3 – 2 || Clancy (6-12) || Bannister (9-10) || Henke (23) || 31,858 || 59-58
|- align="center" bgcolor="bbffbb"
| 118 || August 13 || @ Royals || 2 – 0 || Musselman (5-1) || Saberhagen (12-12) || Ward (9) || 40,204 || 60-58
|- align="center" bgcolor="ffbbbb"
| 119 || August 14 || @ Royals || 6 – 0 || Aquino (1-0) || Flanagan (11-9) || || 27,262 || 60-59
|- align="center" bgcolor="ffbbbb"
| 120 || August 16 || @ White Sox || 5 – 4 || McDowell (5-8) || Key (7-3) || Thigpen (26) || 15,706 || 60-60
|- align="center" bgcolor="ffbbbb"
| 121 || August 17 || @ White Sox || 5 – 1 || Reuss (9-7) || Clancy (6-13) || Rosenberg (1) || 14,367 || 60-61
|- align="center" bgcolor="ffbbbb"
| 122 || August 19 || Brewers || 7 – 4 (10) || Nieves (5-5) || Ward (8-2) || Plesac (29) || 34,178 || 60-62
|- align="center" bgcolor="ffbbbb"
| 123 || August 20 || Brewers || 8 – 1 || Higuera (10-8) || Flanagan (11-10) || || 38,315 || 60-63
|- align="center" bgcolor="bbffbb"
| 124 || August 21 || Brewers || 8 – 4 || Key (8-3) || August (7-6) || || 38,424 || 61-63
|- align="center" bgcolor="bbffbb"
| 125 || August 22 || White Sox || 6 – 3 || Stieb (12-8) || Reuss (9-8) || || 30,501 || 62-63
|- align="center" bgcolor="bbffbb"
| 126 || August 23 || White Sox || 7 – 2 || Clancy (7-13) || Pérez (11-8) || Ward (10) || 28,443 || 63-63
|- align="center" bgcolor="ffbbbb"
| 127 || August 24 || White Sox || 6 – 4 || Long (5-9) || Musselman (5-2) || Thigpen (27) || 33,385 || 63-64
|- align="center" bgcolor="ffbbbb"
| 128 || August 26 || @ Rangers || 5 – 1 || Kilgus (11-11) || Flanagan (11-11) || Williams (17) || 13,642 || 63-65
|- align="center" bgcolor="ffbbbb"
| 129 || August 27 || @ Rangers || 5 – 3 || Hough (11-14) || Key (8-4) || Williams (18) || 21,578 || 63-66
|- align="center" bgcolor="bbffbb"
| 130 || August 28 || @ Rangers || 6 – 5 (11) || Henke (2-3) || McMurtry (2-2) || || 10,166 || 64-66
|- align="center" bgcolor="bbffbb"
| 131 || August 29 || @ Brewers || 6 – 1 || Clancy (8-13) || Filer (5-8) || || 10,207 || 65-66
|- align="center" bgcolor="ffbbbb"
| 132 || August 30 || @ Brewers || 6 – 2 || Higuera (12-8) || Musselman (5-3) || || 11,876 || 65-67
|- align="center" bgcolor="ffbbbb"
| 133 || August 31 || @ Brewers || 4 – 2 || August (8-6) || Flanagan (11-12) || Crim (8) || 11,993 || 65-68
|-

|- align="center" bgcolor="bbffbb"
| 134 || September 1 || Rangers || 5 – 1 || Key (9-4) || Hough (11-15) || || 30,294 || 66-68
|- align="center" bgcolor="bbffbb"
| 135 || September 2 || Rangers || 7 – 6 || Henke (3-3) || Vande Berg (1-2) || || 30,181 || 67-68
|- align="center" bgcolor="bbffbb"
| 136 || September 3 || Rangers || 7 – 4 || Castillo (1-0) || Russell (10-7) || Ward (11) || 33,463 || 68-68
|- align="center" bgcolor="bbffbb"
| 137 || September 4 || Rangers || 9 – 7 || Cerutti (6-6) || Williams (2-5) || || 34,400 || 69-68
|- align="center" bgcolor="bbffbb"
| 138 || September 5 || @ Tigers || 5 – 4 (10) || Stottlemyre (4-8) || Hernández (5-4) || Ward (12) || 21,913 || 70-68
|- align="center" bgcolor="bbffbb"
| 139 || September 6 || @ Tigers || 7 – 3 || Key (10-4) || Alexander (11-11) || Ward (13) || 18,299 || 71-68
|- align="center" bgcolor="ffbbbb"
| 140 || September 7 || @ Tigers || 4 – 3 || Henneman (8-4) || Cerutti (6-7) || || 21,614 || 71-69
|- align="center" bgcolor="bbffbb"
| 141 || September 9 || @ Orioles || 8 – 1 || Clancy (9-13) || Bautista (6-13) || || 14,750 || 72-69
|- align="center" bgcolor="ffbbbb"
| 142 || September 10 || @ Orioles || 7 – 4 || Ballard (8-11) || Musselman (5-4) || Williamson (2) || 21,945 || 72-70
|- align="center" bgcolor="ffbbbb"
| 143 || September 11 || @ Orioles || 4 – 2 || Schmidt (8-4) || Flanagan (11-13) || Thurmond (3) || 19,364 || 72-71
|- align="center" bgcolor="ffbbbb"
| 144 || September 12 || Tigers || 6 – 5 || Huismann (1-0) || Henke (3-4) || Hernández (9) || 31,354 || 72-72
|- align="center" bgcolor="bbffbb"
| 145 || September 13 || Tigers || 9 – 1 || Stieb (13-8) || Power (5-7) || || 32,141 || 73-72
|- align="center" bgcolor="bbffbb"
| 146 || September 14 || Tigers || 3 – 2 || Ward (9-2) || Terrell (7-14) || || 32,469 || 74-72
|- align="center" bgcolor="bbffbb"
| 147 || September 15 || Indians || 3 – 0 || Musselman (6-4) || Walker (0-1) || Henke (24) || 28,544 || 75-72
|- align="center" bgcolor="bbffbb"
| 148 || September 16 || Indians || 4 – 3 (10) || Henke (4-4) || Gordon (2-4) || || 30,276 || 76-72
|- align="center" bgcolor="ffbbbb"
| 149 || September 17 || Indians || 12 – 3 || Swindell (17-13) || Key (10-5) || Dedmon (1) || 32,067 || 76-73
|- align="center" bgcolor="bbffbb"
| 150 || September 18 || Indians || 4 – 0 || Stieb (14-8) || Nichols (1-5) || || 34,422 || 77-73
|- align="center" bgcolor="bbffbb"
| 151 || September 19 || Red Sox || 5 – 4 || Clancy (10-13) || Lamp (6-5) || Ward (14) || 28,455 || 78-73
|- align="center" bgcolor="ffbbbb"
| 152 || September 20 || Red Sox || 13 – 2 || Clemens (17-11) || Musselman (6-5) || || 30,352 || 78-74
|- align="center" bgcolor="bbffbb"
| 153 || September 21 || Red Sox || 1 – 0 || Flanagan (12-13) || Gardner (8-5) || Ward (15) || 30,344 || 79-74
|- align="center" bgcolor="bbffbb"
| 154 || September 23 || @ Indians || 4 – 2 || Key (11-5) || Swindell (17-14) || Henke (25) || 7,995 || 80-74
|- align="center" bgcolor="bbffbb"
| 155 || September 24 || @ Indians || 1 – 0 || Stieb (15-8) || Nichols (1-6) || || 8,157 || 81-74
|- align="center" bgcolor="ffbbbb"
| 156 || September 25 || @ Indians || 4 – 3 || Bailes (9-14) || Ward (9-3) || || 7,915 || 81-75
|- align="center" bgcolor="bbffbb"
| 157 || September 26 || @ Red Sox || 11 – 1 || Musselman (7-5) || Gardner (8-6) || || 33,953 || 82-75
|- align="center" bgcolor="bbffbb"
| 158 || September 27 || @ Red Sox || 15 – 9 || Flanagan (13-13) || Smithson (9-6) || || 34,442 || 83-75
|- align="center" bgcolor="bbffbb"
| 159 || September 28 || @ Red Sox || 1 – 0 || Key (12-5) || Hurst (18-6) || || 34,873 || 84-75
|- align="center" bgcolor="bbffbb"
| 160 || September 30 || Orioles || 4 – 0 || Stieb (16-8) || Ballard (8-12) || || 32,374 || 85-75
|-

|- align="center" bgcolor="bbffbb"
| 161 || October 1 || Orioles || 7 – 3 || Clancy (11-13) || Tibbs (4-15) || Cerutti (1) || 32,637 || 86-75
|- align="center" bgcolor="bbffbb"
| 162 || October 2 || Orioles || 9 – 3 || Musselman (8-5) || Schilling (0-3) || || 34,046 || 87-75
|-

Player stats

Batting

Starters by position
Note: Pos = Position; G = Games played; AB = At bats; H = Hits; Avg. = Batting average; HR = Home runs; RBI = Runs batted in

Other batters
Note: G = Games played; AB = At bats; H = Hits; Avg. = Batting average; HR = Home runs; RBI = Runs batted in

Pitching

Starting pitchers
Note: G = Games pitched; IP = Innings pitched; W = Wins; L = Losses; ERA = Earned run average; SO = Strikeouts

Other pitchers
Note: G = Games pitched; IP = Innings pitched; W = Wins; L = Losses; ERA = Earned run average; SO = Strikeouts

Relief pitchers
Note: G = Games pitched; W = Wins; L = Losses; SV = Saves; ERA = Earned run average; SO = Strikeouts

Awards and records
George Bell, Most Home Runs hit on Opening Day (3)
Tony Fernández, Gold Glove Award

All-Star Game
Dave Stieb, pitcher

Farm system

References

External links
1988 Toronto Blue Jays at Baseball Reference
1988 Toronto Blue Jays at Baseball Almanac

Toronto Blue Jays seasons
1988 in Canadian sports
Toronto Blue Jays
Toronto Blue Jays